Scheuren Stream is a meltwater stream 1 nautical mile (1.9 km) west of Gneiss Point on the coast of Victoria Land. It issues from the front of Wilson Piedmont Glacier and drains northward to the Bay of Sails. The stream was studied by Robert L. Nichols, geologist for Metcalf and Eddy, Engineers, Boston, MA, which made engineering studies here under contract to the U.S. Navy in 1957–58 season. Named by Nichols for John J. Scheuren, Jr., chief of Metcalf and Eddy's field party.

Rivers of Victoria Land
Scott Coast